A plant-based diet is a diet consisting mostly or entirely of plant-based foods. Plant-based diets encompass a wide range of dietary patterns that contain low amounts of animal products and high amounts of plant products such as vegetables, fruits, whole grains, legumes, nuts and seeds. They do not need to be vegan or vegetarian but are defined in terms of low frequency of animal food consumption.

Terminology
Origin of the term "plant-based diet" is attributed to Cornell University nutritional biochemist T. Colin Campbell who presented his diet research at the US National Institutes of Health in 1980. Campbell's research about a plant-based diet extended from The China Project, a decade-long study of dietary practices in rural China, giving evidence that a diet low in animal protein and fat, and high in plant foods, could reduce the incidence of several diseases. In 2005, Campbell and his son published The China Study, a best-selling book emphasizing the potential health benefits of a plant-based diet. Campbell also used the plant-based concept to educate consumers about how eating meat had significant environmental consequences.

Some authors draw a distinction between diets that are "plant-based" or "plant-only". A plant-based diet may be defined as consuming plant-sourced foods that are minimally processed.

A review analyzing the use of the term plant-based diet in medical literature found that 50% of clinical trials use the term interchangeably with vegan, meaning that the interventional diet did not include foods of animal origin. 30% of studies included dairy products and 20% meat.

In 2021, the World Health Organization (WHO) stated that "plant-based diets constitute a diverse range of dietary patterns that emphasize foods derived from plant sources coupled with lower consumption or exclusion of animal products. Vegetarian diets form a subset of plant-based diets, which may exclude the consumption of some or all forms of animal foods." The WHO lists, flexitarian, lacto-vegetarian, lacto-ovo vegetarian, ovo-vegetarian, pescatarian and vegan diets as plant-based.

Motivation and prevalence 
As of the early 21st century, some 4 billion people are estimated to live primarily on a plant-based diet, some by choice and some because of limits caused by shortages of crops, fresh water, and energy resources. Main motivations to follow a plant-based diet appear to be health aspirations, taste, animal welfare, environmental concern, and weight loss.

Health research

Plant-based diets are of interest in preventing and managing chronic diseases.

Diet quality 
Not all plant-based foods are equally healthy. Rather, plant-based diets including whole grains as the main form of carbohydrate, unsaturated fats as the main form of dietary fat, an abundance of fruit and vegetables, and adequate n-3 fatty acids can be considered healthy.

With ultra-processed plant-based foods, such as vegan burger patties or chicken nuggets, becoming more available, there is also concern that plant-based diets incorporating these foods may become less healthy.

In practice lacto-ovo vegetarians or vegans seem to have a higher overall diet quality compared with nonvegetarians. The reason for this is the closer adherence to health organisation recommendations on consumption of fruits, whole grains, seafood and plant protein and sodium. The higher diet quality in vegetarians and vegans may explain some of the positive health outcomes compared with nonvegetarians.

Weight 
Observational studies show that vegetarian diets are lower in energy intake than non-vegetarian diets and that, on average, vegetarians have a lower body mass index than non-vegetarians.

In obese people, a 2022 review found that plant-based diets improved weight control, LDL and total cholesterol, blood pressure, insulin resistance, and fasting glucose.

Diabetes 
Some reviews indicate that plant-based diets including fruits, vegetables, whole grains, legumes, and nuts are associated with a lower risk of diabetes.

Therefor vegetarian and vegan diets are under clinical research to identify potential effects on type 2 diabetes, with preliminary results showing improvements in body weight and biomarkers of metabolic syndrome.

When the focus was whole foods, an improvement of diabetes biomarkers occurred, including reduced obesity. In diabetic people, plant-based diets were also associated with improved emotional and physical well-being, relief of depression, higher quality of life, and better general health.

The American College of Lifestyle Medicine stated that diet can achieve remission in many adults with type 2 diabetes when used as a primary intervention of whole, plant-based foods with minimal consumption of meat and other animal products. There remains a need for more randomized controlled trials "to assess sustainable plant-based dietary interventions with whole or minimally processed foods, as a primary means of treating diabetes with the goal of remission."

Cancer 
There is some evidence that plant-based diets decrease the risk of cancer. Vegetarian diets are associated with a lower incidence from total cancer (-8%). A vegan diet seems to reduced risk of incidence from total cancer by -15%. However, there was no improvement in cancer mortality.

Microbiome 
Preliminary studies indicate that a plant-based diet may improve the gut microbiome.

Cardiovascular diseases 
Prospective cohort studies show that vegetarian diets are associated with reduced risk of CVD and Ischemic Heart Disease, but not stroke. For vegan diets only a reduced risk in IHD was found.

Clinical trials show that plant-based diets, including vegan and vegetarian diets, may lower blood pressure, and blood cholesterol levels.

People on a long-term vegan diet show improvements in cardiometabolic risk factors. Clinical trials also show that the changes in blood pressure associated with a vegan diet without caloric restrictions are comparable to those of dietary practices recommended by medical societies and use of portion-controlled diets.

Bone health 
The effect of plant-based diets on bone health is inconclusive. Preliminary research indicates that consuming a plant-based diet may be associated with lower bone density, a risk factor for fractures.

Inflammation 
Plant-based diets are under study for their potential to reduce inflammation. C-reactive protein  a biomarker for inflammation  may be reduced by consuming a plant-based diet, particularly in obese people.

Mortality 
A 2020 review stated that dietary patterns based on consuming vegetables, fruits, legumes, nuts, whole grains, unsaturated vegetable oils, fish, lean meat or poultry, and are low in processed meat, high-fat dairy and refined carbohydrates or sweets, are associated with a decreased risk of all-cause mortality.

Sustainability 

There is scientific consensus that plant-based diets offer lower greenhouse gas emissions, land use and biodiversity loss. In addition, dietary patterns that reduce diet-related mortality also promote environmental sustainablity. 

As a significant percentage of crops around the world are used to feed livestock rather than humans, eating less animal products helps to limit climate change and biodiversity loss. Especially beef, lamb and cheese have a very high carbon footprint. While soy cultivation is a "major driver of deforestation in the Amazon basin", the vast majority of soy crops are used for livestock consumption rather than human consumption. Adopting plant-based diets could also reduce the number of animals raised and killed for food on factory farms.

Research from 2019 on six diets found the plant-based diets more environmentally friendly than the diets higher in animal-sourced foods. Of the six mutually-exclusive diets; individuals eating vegan, vegetarian and pescetarian diets had lower dietary-carbon footprints than typical omnivorous diets, while those who ate 'paleolithic' and ketogenic diets had higher dietary-carbon emissions due to their animal sourced foods.

A 2020 study found that the climate change mitigation effects of shifting worldwide food production and consumption to plant-based diets, which are mainly composed of foods that require only a small fraction of the land and CO2 emissions required for meat and dairy, could offset CO2 emissions equal to those of past 9 to 16 years of fossil fuel emissions in nations that they grouped into 4 types. The researchers also provided a map of approximate regional opportunities.

According to a 2021 Chatham House report, supported by the United Nations Environment Programme, a shift to "predominantly plant-based diets" will be needed to reduce biodiversity loss and human impact on the environment. The report said that livestock has the largest environmental impact, with some 80% of all global farmland used to rear cattle, sheep and other animals used by humans for food. Moving towards plant-based diets would free up the land to allow for the restoration of ecosystems and the flourishing of biodiversity.

A 2022 study published in Nature Food found that if high-income nations switched to a plant-based diet, vast swaths of land used for animal agriculture could be allowed to return to their natural state, which in turn has the potential to pull 100 billion tons of  out of the atmosphere by the end of the century. Around 35% of all habitable land around the world is used to rear animals used by humans in food production.

Politics 
A reduction in meat consumption and a shift to more plant-based diets is needed to reach climate targets, addressing public health problems, and protecting animal welfare. Research has been done on how to best promote such a change in consumer behaviour.

Some public health organisations advocate a plant-based diet due to its low ecological footprint. These include the Swedish Food Agency in its dietary guideline and a group of Lancet researchers who propose a planetary health diet. Vegan climate activist Greta Thunberg also called for more plant-based food production and consumption worldwide. A 2022 report by the Stockholm Environment Institute and the Council On Energy, Environment and Water included protecting animal welfare and adopting plant based diets on a list of recommendations to help mitigate the ecological and social crises bringing the world to a "boiling point".

See also 
 List of diets
 Veganism
 Mediterranean diet

References